Broxa-cum-Troutsdale is a civil parish in the Scarborough district of North Yorkshire, England. The population as of the 2011 census remained less than 100. Details are included in the civil parish of Hackness. The parish includes the village of Broxa, and covers part of Troutsdale.

According to the 2001 UK census, Broxa-cum-Troutsdale parish had a population of 44.

The parish council is Hackness & Harwood Dale Group Parish Council which covers the six parishes of Broxa-cum-Troutsdale, Darncombe-cum-Langdale End, Hackness, Harwood Dale, Silpho and Suffield-cum-Everley.

References

External links
Hackness & Harwood Dale Group Parish Council website

Civil parishes in North Yorkshire